The kilogram-force (kgf or kgF), or kilopond (kp, from ), is a non-standard gravitational metric unit of force. It does not comply with the International System of Units (SI) and is deprecated for most uses. The kilogram-force is equal to the magnitude of the force exerted on one kilogram of mass in a  gravitational field (standard gravity, a conventional value approximating the average magnitude of gravity on Earth). That is, it is the weight of a kilogram under standard gravity.

Kilogram-force is a non-standard unit and is classified in the International System of Units (SI) as a unit that is not accepted for use with SI.

History
The gram-force and kilogram-force were never well-defined units until the CGPM adopted a standard acceleration of gravity of 9.80665 m/s2 for this purpose in 1901, though they had been used in low-precision measurements of force before that time. Even then, the proposal to define kilogram-force as standard unit of force was explicitly rejected. Instead, the newton was proposed in 1913 and accepted in 1948.
The kilogram-force has never been a part of the International System of Units (SI), which was introduced in 1960. The SI unit of force is the newton.

Prior to this, the unit was widely used in much of the world. It is still in use for some purposes, for example, it is used for the tension of bicycle spokes, for informal references to pressure in kilograms per square centimetre (1 kp/cm2) which is the technical atmosphere (at) and very close to 1 bar and the standard atmosphere (atm), for the draw weight of bows in archery, for the strength of bond wire in grams-force, and to define the "metric horsepower" (PS) as 75 metre-kiloponds per second. In addition, the kilogram force was the standard unit used for Vickers hardness testing.

In 1940s, Germany, the thrust of a rocket engine was measured in kilograms-force, in the Soviet Union it remained the primary unit for thrust in the Russian space program until at least the late 1980s.

The term "kilopond" has been declared obsolete.

Related units 
The tonne-force, metric ton-force, megagram-force, and megapond (Mp) are each 1000 kilograms-force.

The decanewton or dekanewton (daN), exactly 10 N, is used in some fields as an approximation to the kilogram-force, because it is close to the 9.80665 N of 1 kgf.

See also
 Metrology
 Avoirdupois

References 

Units of force
Non-SI metric units